The Pakistan U-23 national football team is a youth football team operated under the Pakistan Football Federation. The team represented Pakistan at the Summer Olympics, AFC U-22 Asian Cup, and the Asian Games.

Competitive record

AFC U-23 Championship
AFC U-23 Championship was initially set to be held as AFC U-22 Championships in 2013 and its qualification matches in 2012, but the finals tournament was postponed to be played in January 2014.

Olympic record

Asian Games

Players

Current squad 
 The following players were part of the 2018 Asian Games.

Recent call-ups
The following players were part of the preparation camp in Bahrain for 2018 Asian Games.

Result and fixtures 
''For all previous match results of the national under-23 team, see the team's results page

2016

2018 

FIFA restored membership of PFF on March 13, 2018. With the Asian Games approaching in August and SAFF Cup in September, the Pakistan football team had little time to prepare. PFF announced the signing of new Brazilian coach José Antonio Nogueira and started camps in Lahore. The team played friendlies in Bahrain with their premier clubs from mid-July to the end of the month. Pakistan lost 1, drew 1 and won 2 matches in Bahrain. The Pakistan national under-23 football team along with 3 senior players flew to Bahrain in mid-August to take part in the Asian Games. On August 14, 2018, the team played its first group game against the then runner ups of 2018 AFC U-23 Championship, which resulted in a 3-0 loss. On August 16, 2018, the team lost to Japan, 4-0. Pakistan defeated Nepal by 2-1 in their final group game, which was the former's first win in Asian Games after 44 years. Pakistan expected to qualify for the knockouts being 3rd in the group. However, the team fell short in terms of goal difference.

Current staff

See also 
 Pakistan Football Federation
 Pakistan national football team
 Pakistan national under-20 football team
 Pakistan national under-17 football team
 Pakistan women's national football team

References 

under-23
Asian national under-23 association football teams